Yevgeny Lvovych Streltsov is a Ukrainian scientist and specialist in law and theology. He is Doctor of Law Sciences, Doctor of Theology, Professor, Corresponding Member of the National Academy of Legal Sciences of Ukraine, Honored Scientific Worker of Ukraine; Holder of 11 state awards, including: the Order of Merits of Ukraine of the 1st, the 2nd and the 3rd degrees, the insignia of the President of Ukraine – Medal “Twenty Years of Ukraine’s Independence, a son of Ukrainian law researcher Lev Streltsov.

Research and Pedagogical Contributions 
Streltsov graduated the Odessa State University named after I.I. Mechnikov (currently – Odessa National University named after I.I.Mechnikov), Law Faculty and is a post graduate student of the Kharkiv Law Institute (1976–1980) receiving PhD Degree (Candidate of Law Sciences) (1981), title of an associate professor (1985). In 1989-92 he was a doctoral researcher at the Yaroslav Mudryi National Law University receiving a doctorate degree (Doctor of Law Sciences) (1992) and title of a professor (1995). In 2007-09 Streltsov also was a doctoral researcher of the Ukrainian Academy of Theology receiving a Doctor of Theology (2010). In 2010 he was admitted as Corresponding Member to the National Academy of Legal Sciences of Ukraine.

Streltsov is an author of some 300 scientific works devoted to general and specific problems of law, including 9 monographs (5 of which are individually written and 4 is a collective work) and 15 different manuals and courses of lectures (part of them were published abroad). He gained an award for his book Economic Crimes: Domestic and International Aspects (Foreword by Prof. Jess Maghan, USA) and was recognized as an “important and solid research” at the 3rd Ukrainian contest for the best legal publication. His book Economic Crimes is kept in the US Congress Library. Streltsov was named five times as one of the best authors of publications in the field of law in Ukraine.

Under his supervision there were defended 29 theses for a candidate’s of juridical sciences degree (PhD theses).

Scientific and Organizational Contributions 
Streltsov is a founder and a leader of the scientific school (sector) Basic Institutions and Trends of the Development of Legislation in the Area of Criminal Law. He was a member of editorial boards for three Ukrainian and one foreign professional journals.

Bibliography
 Textbook on Criminal Law of Ukraine, 8th edition (editor-in-chief and co-author) that received a special permission by the Ministry of Education and Science of Ukraine for studying at higher law educational institutions of Ukraine. 
 Scientific and practical commentaries to the Criminal Code of Ukraine, 9th edition (editor-in-chief and co-author)
 Two scientific and practical commentaries to the Laws of Ukraine: On Principles of Prevention and Counteraction Corruption, On Advocacy, On Militia; etc. (co-editor-in-chief and co-author)
 Herald of the Southern Scientific Center of the National Academy of Legal Science of Ukraine, scientific journal (editor-in-chief)

Foreign Scholarships, Awards and Contributions 
Fulbright Scholar in the USA (1998-1999).
DAAD (German Department for International Exchanges) Scholar (2001).
The Max-Planck Academic Community (Germany) Scholar (2005, 2009, 2013) 

Participated in internship projects at : the Office of International Criminal Justice (USA);the Institute of Constitutional And Legislative Policy (Hungary); the Institute of State and Law Named After Koretskiy (Ukraine); the   Max Planck Institute for Foreign and International Criminal Law (Germany). He was also invited for delivering lectures at universities of Canada, USA, and Germany; has had scholarly works published abroad.
   
Foreign professors of law wrote forewords for his three books, namely: 1. Economic Crimes in Ukraine. – BAHVA, 1997. – A foreword by Dean, Head of the Department of Criminal Law and Criminal Procedure Professor, Dr. Martin Fincke (Passau University, Germany); 2. Economic Crimes: Domestic and International Aspects. – Astroprint, 2000. – A foreword by co-director of the Office of International Criminal Justice Professor, Dr. Jess Meghan (University of Illinois in Chicago, the USA); 3. Religious Traditions in a Secular State. - Charles’s University, Prague, 2014. – A Foreword by Dean of the Faculty of Theology Professor, Doctor of Theology Jan Bogoslav Lashek (Charles’s University, Check Republic).

Professor Streltsov is president of the international association Education Without Borders (Ukraine);  vice-president of the Ukrainian Association of Criminologists (Kharkov, Ukraine) ;a  member of the Coordination Bureau on Criminal Law of the National Academy of Legal Sciences of Ukraine (Kharkov, Ukraine);a  member of the International Association of Criminal Law (Paris, France); a member of Ukrainian Association of International Law (Kiev, Ukraine);  a member of the Ukrainian Association of Criminal Law (Kharkov, Ukraine). A Member of the National Union of Journalists of Ukraine.

State Awards 
Honored Scientific Worker of Ukraine (2002)
Absolute Cavalier of Order For Merits (2014, 2009, 2006)
Insignia of the President of Ukraine – Jubilee’s Medal Twenty Years of Ukraine’s Independence (2012); medal Defender of Homeland (1999); awarded other six state medals.
Gratitude from the Cabinet of Ministries of Ukraine (2008)
Excellent Worker of Education of Ukraine (1997).

Was awarded honorary medals: 1) by Chairman of Odessa Regional State Administration (2005);2) by Mayor of Odessa (2009); Anton Makarenko medal by Ministry of Education and Science of Ukraine (2005).

Public recognition of merits 
Winner of the international rating of achievements and popularity held by the investment forum “World.Europe.Ukraine” and a holder of Order for Remarkable Achievements of the 1st Degree (2003).
A Man of the Year under the nomination Intellect of Odessa and honorary symbol The Crystal Pearl (2003).
For contributions made for the development of theological science was awarded: 1) Order of “Nestor the Chronicler” of the 2-nd degree (2011); 2) Order of “Dimitriy the Clergyman” (2013); 3) Medal of “Saint Andrei Pervozvaniy (The First-Called)” of the 2-nd degree (2010); 4) the Cross of Doctor of Theology (2010).

References

External links 
 Article in the Informational and Analytical Centers of Odessa

Living people
1949 births
Academic staff of Yaroslav Mudryi National Law University
Yaroslav Mudryi National Law University alumni
Odesa University alumni
Writers from Odesa